MouthShut is an Indian review website. The company was founded in 2000 by Faisal Farooqui. Its competitors include Trustpilot, SiteJabber and Trustvocate.

Legal issues

Access blocked by Beam Fiber ISP
From February 3rd to 5th in 2014, Indian ISP Beam Fiber, blocked access to the site for the cities of Bangalore and Hyderabad. MouthShut has claimed that the blocking was illegal.

Shreya Singhal v. Union of India 

In 2012, lawyer Shreya Singhal filed Public Interest Litigation in the Supreme Court of India, against Section 66A of the Information Technology Act. As part of the case, petitions were filed by organisations including People's Union for Civil Liberties, Common Cause and MouthShut.

References 

Review websites